"Orange Soda" (stylized in all caps) is a song by American rapper Baby Keem. It was released on July 16, 2019 as the lead single from his second mixtape Die for My Bitch. The song was produced by Baby Keem himself, alongside Keanu Beats. The song was a sleeper hit, becoming Baby Keem's first song to chart on the US Billboard Hot 100, entering at number 98 in January 2020.

Critical reception
In naming Die for My Bitch one of the 50 best hip hop projects of 2019, P.A.B. of XXL called the track "ethereal", noting that Keem "injects melody and hilarious boasts into tracks" with his "lithe vocals".

Music video
A music video for the track was released on November 13, 2019. It was filmed in New York City and directed by Dave Free.

Other versions
The song was remixed by American rapper Rich the Kid, released in February 2020.

Charts

Certifications

References

2019 singles
2019 songs
Baby Keem songs
Music videos directed by Dave Free
Dirty rap songs